Daye Jack is a Nigerian-American hip hop artist from Atlanta, Georgia. He is best known for his single "Hands Up" featuring Killer Mike which peaked at #14 on the Billboard Twitter Emerging Artists chart.

Early life and education

Jack was born in Port Harcourt, the capital and largest city of Rivers State, Nigeria 1 February 1996. He grew up in Atlanta. His father was originally from Nigeria but grew up in California. His father later returned to Nigeria to marry Jack's mother and then moved back to Atlanta. Jack got involved in programming while in high school and went on to attend New York University. It was during his time at NYU that he began his music career.

Career

Jack released his first mixtape, Hello World, at the age of 18 while attending NYU. He released it on SoundCloud and was soon contacted by numerous blogs who asked him to submit new music. Jack was contacted by producer Mike Elizondo and he flew to Los Angeles to perform some demos, eventually leading to a contract with Warner Bros. Records. In 2015 he released the EP Soul Glitch under the Warner Bros. label.

After the release of Soul Glitch, Jack collaborated with Killer Mike in 2015 for the release of the single Hands Up. The video was released exclusively on Billboard which called it "emotionally charged" with a "powerful message of solidarity." The video was released on the first day of Black History Month in 2016 and the song peaked at #14 on the Billboard Twitter Emerging Artists chart.

In addition to his collaboration with Killer Mike, Jack has worked with numerous other artists. In 2015 he was featured on the song Expensive from Tori Kelly's album Unbreakable Smile. Jack also sang background vocals for Ariana Grande's 2016 album Dangerous Woman. In early 2016, Jack toured nationally with Pell on the Only in Your Dreams tour, and also toured with Lukas Graham.

Jack released his first full-length project No Data in March 2017.

Musical style

Jack attributes his musical style to his family background and has been described as a "hip-hop singer." He describes himself as making experimental hip-hop with rapping, singing, and speaking all being part of it. Jack cites some of his influencers as being André 3000 and 50 Cent.

Discography

Albums

EP's

Mixtapes

As a lead artist

Featured Appearances

References

External links
 Daye Jack official

Living people
1996 births
African-American male rappers
Rappers from Atlanta
American people of Nigerian descent
Warner Records artists
Rappers from Port Harcourt
21st-century American rappers
21st-century American male musicians
21st-century African-American musicians